Dr. Henry Jacala Ramos (born July 15, 1950) is a professor emeritus of Physics at the University of the Philippines Diliman and the first Filipino experimental plasma physicist. He is the founder of the Plasma Physics Laboratory, National Institute of Physics, UP Diliman College of Science.

His work on formation of titanium nitride films received patents from the United States, Philippines, Malaysia, Germany, Sweden, Taiwan, Japan, Singapore and China.

References

External links
National Institute of Physics, Philippines

1950 births
Living people
Filipino physicists
Filipino educators
University of the Philippines alumni
21st-century Filipino scientists